San Saba is a city located in, and the county seat of, San Saba County, Texas, United States. It was settled in 1854 and named for its location on the San Saba River. Its population was 3,099 at the 2010 census.

Geography

San Saba is located at  (31.195298, –98.725003). According to the United States Census Bureau, the city has a total area of 1.8 sq mi (4.7 km), all of it land.

Climate

The climate in this area is characterized by hot, humid summers and generally mild to cool winters.  According to the Köppen climate classification, San Saba has a humid subtropical climate, Cfa on climate maps.

Demographics

2020 census

As of the 2020 United States census, there were 3,117 people, 1,022 households, and 653 families residing in the city.

2010 census
As of the census of 2010,  people,  households, and 680 families resided in the city. The population density was  people/sq mi (565.6/km). The  housing units  averaged 655.5/sq mi (252.5/km). The racial makeup of the city was 78.54% White, 0.64% African American, 1.74% Native American, 0.11% Asian, 17.33% from other races, and 1.63% from two or more races. Hispanics or Latinos of any race were 31.51% of the population.

Of the 1,008 households, 30.9% had children under  18 living with them, 52.2% were married couples living together, 11.8% had a female householder with no husband present, and 32.5% were not families. About 30.9% of all households were made up of individuals, and 18.7% had someone living alone who was 65 or older. The average household size was 2.50, and the average family size was 3.12.

The population was distributed as 27.0% under 18, 6.5% from 18 to 24, 23.7% from 25 to 44, 20.1% from 45 to 64, and 22.7% who were 65 or older. The median age was 39 years. For every 100 females, there were 82.4 males. For every 100 females age 18 and over, there were 79.2 males.

The median income for a household in the city was $, and for a family was $. Males had a median income of $ versus $ for females. The per capita income for the city was $. About 16.0% of families and 19.6% of the population were below the poverty line, including 29.9% of those under age 18 and 12.1% of those age 65 or over.

Economy
Pecans emerged as an important crop, largely because of the work of Edmund E. Risien, an Englishman who moved to San Saba County in 1874, and made improvement of the native nuts his life's work. Risien founded the West Texas Pecan Nursery at the junction of the San Saba and Colorado Rivers. The "Mother Pecan Tree", located in the heart of this orchard, has been used to produce many great pecan varieties. Some of these include the San Saba Improved, Texas Prolific, Onliwon, Squirrel Delight, No.60, and Western Schley, and these are just a few of the varieties this tree has produced.

During his era, Risien's customer base included Queen Victoria of the United Kingdom, Alfred Lord Tennyson, and the Post Cereals Co. Today, Risien is credited for laying the groundwork for the pecan industry that led San Saba County to proclaim itself "Pecan Capital of the World".  Today, the land and orchard are owned by the Millican family, and six generations have worked in the pecan business.

Education

The City of San Saba is served by the San Saba Independent School District. Its schools include San Saba Elementary, serving students in kindergarten-grade 4; San Saba Middle School, serving grades 5–8; and San Saba High School, grades 9–12. The school district opened two new facilities in October 2013: an elementary building meant to host all elementary grades under one roof, and a set of science labs in a building immediately across from the main entrance to the high school; the science labs are named for science teacher George Dennis, who was a school district faculty member for over 50 years until retiring in December 2012. The current superintendent of schools is Michael Bohensky, and the individual campuses are headed by Kay Shackelford (elementary), Dustin Anders (middle school), and Scott Snyder (high school).

Notable people

 Tommy Lee Jones, actor
 M. King Hubbert, a geologist 
 Thomas Stewart, an opera singer
 Aaron Behrens, front man for Austin-based music group Ghostland Observatory

References

External links

 San Saba Chamber of Commerce
 San Saba News & Star
 City of San Saba
 Millican Pecan Company

San Saba County, Texas
Cities in Texas
County seats in Texas
1854 establishments in Texas